David Haslam may refer to:
 Sir David Haslam (Royal Navy officer) (1923–2009)
 David Haslam (physician) (born 1949), Chair of the National Institute for Health and Care Excellence
 David Haslam (GP), Chairman of the National Obesity Forum
 David Haslam (conductor), conductor of the English Philharmonic Orchestra
 Dave Haslam, writer, broadcaster and DJ